Habroteleia flavipes, is a species of wasp belonging to the family Platygastridae.

Distribution
It is found throughout South Asian and South East Asian countries such as India, Sri Lanka, Bangladesh, Philippines, Indonesia, Cambodia, Brunei, China, South Korea, Thailand, Vietnam and Malaysia.

Description
Female is larger than male. Body length of female is about 4.36–4.72 mm, whereas male is 4.15–4.52 mm. Mesosoma and metasoma are black. Antennae punctate rugose to smooth. Central keel absent.

References

Insects described in 1905
Scelioninae